Events from the year 1932 in Taiwan, Empire of Japan.

Incumbents

Central government of Japan
 Prime Minister: Inukai Tsuyoshi, Saitō Makoto

Taiwan
 Governor-General – Ōta Masahiro, Hiroshi Minami, Nakagawa Kenzō

Events

December
 5 December – The opening of Hayashi Department Store in Tainan Prefecture.

Births
 16 September – Cheng Ch'ing-wen, former writer
 16 December – Chiang Pin-kung, Chairman of the Straits Exchange Foundation (2008–2012). (d. 2018)

References

 
1930s in Taiwan
Years of the 20th century in Taiwan